Alessandro "Alex" Righetti (born August 14, 1977) is an Italian former professional basketball player. Righetti won the silver medal with the Italian men's national team at the 2004 Summer Olympics in Athens, Greece. In April 2017, his retirement was announced.

References

External links 
 
 
 

1977 births
Living people
Basket Ferentino players
Basket Rimini Crabs players
Basketball players at the 2004 Summer Olympics
Italian men's basketball players
Juvecaserta Basket players
Medalists at the 2004 Summer Olympics
Olympic basketball players of Italy
Olympic medalists in basketball
Olympic silver medalists for Italy
Pallacanestro Varese players
Pallacanestro Virtus Roma players
Sportspeople from Rimini
S.S. Felice Scandone players
Small forwards
Virtus Bologna players